The Houston Film Critics Society Award for Best Cinematography is an annual award given by the Houston Film Critics Society.

Winners

2000s

2010s

2020s

References
 Houston Film Critics Society official website

C
Awards for best cinematography